Destination 60,000 (aka Jet) is a 65-minute 1957 drama film, directed by George Waggner and produced by the Allied Artists Pictures . The film stars Preston Foster, Pat Conway and  Jeff Donnell. Destination 60,000 depicts the life of test pilots flying the fastest experimental supersonic fighter designs from Edwards Air Force Base.

Plot
A new experimental aircraft, "The Dream" is the pride of the Buckley Aircraft Corporation. Owner Colonel Ed Buckley (Preston Foster), has designed and built a prototype that his former wartime flying buddy, Jeff Connors (Pat Conway), wants to fly. Buckley's wife Ruth likes Jeff, who is godfather to their son "Skip" (Bobby Clark). Test flying is dangerous work, and Jeff has to learn how to fly to supersonic speeds, coached by Mickey Hill (Denver Pyle). Ed's secretary, Mary Ellen (Coleen Gray), is another reason for Jeff to want to join the company.

Although Mickey is scheduled to do the first test, his wife Grace (Anne Barton) is expecting, so Ed assigns Jeff. "The Dream" is carried to altitude by a Boeing B-29/P2B mothership before being released to fly on its own power. When Jeff tries to ignite the rocket motors, the aircraft explodes. but he ejects using an escape pod, landing safely. Suspected of somehow being responsible for the explosion, he is placed on a 30-day suspension, but Jeff protests and quits. With his partner Dan Maddox (Russell Thorson), Ed constructs a second prototype, with Mickey as the test pilot.

A repeat of the same explosion lands Mickey in the hospital. He had blacked out, but the automatic escape pod had deployed, saving his life. In a visit to the hospital where he sees Ed, Jeff asks to come back, claiming he will serve his suspension while a new aircraft is being built. With his company's fortunes at a low ebb, Ed believes he has the answer to the violent explosions and elects to fly the next test himself. Jeff accompanies him. "The Dream" climbs to 60,000 feet, then Ed cuts the motors and reignites them successfully, but blacks out. Jeff sends out a Mayday, shouting, "Bandits at two o'clock." Like he had in wartime, Ed instinctively reacts and pulls out of the dive. With the test a success and the company again in good shape, Ed and Jeff land safely and return to Ruth and Mary, who are waiting for them.

Cast

 Preston Foster as Col. Ed Buckley
 Pat Conway as Pat Connors
 Jeff Donnell as Ruth Buckley
 Coleen Gray as Mary Ellen
 Bobby Clark as "Skip" Buckley
 Denver Pyle as Mickey Hill
 Russell Thorson as Dan Maddox
 Anne Barton as Grace Hill

Production

Destination 60,000 has the feel of a docudrama, weaving a fictional story into a depiction of the brave test pilots flying the Douglas D-558-2 Skyrocket. Principal photography began in mid-August 1956 at California Studios. Full cooperation from the Douglas Aircraft Company was acknowledged. The ability to film at Edwards Air Force Base also enhanced the "first-hand" descriptions.

Reception
Destination 60,000 was primarily a B film, "one of a cycle of late-1950s films dealing with the exploits of supersonic-jet test pilots.  ... Destination 60,000 was put together by Gross-Krasne Productions, a firm more closely associated with weekly TV series (Big Town, Dr. Hudson's Secret Journal, Mayor of the Town, etc.)."

See also
 List of American films of 1957

References
Notes

Citations

Bibliography

 Libis, Scott. Douglas D-558-2 Skyrocket (Naval Fighters Number Fifty-Seven). Simi Valley, California: Ginter Books, 2002. .
 Winchester, Jim. "Grumman X-29". X-Planes and Prototypes. London: Amber Books, 2005. .

External links
 
 

1957 films
1957 drama films
American aviation films
Allied Artists films
Films scored by Albert Glasser
1950s English-language films
Films directed by George Waggner
1950s American films